Bradley Thomas Wing (born 27 January 1991) is an Australian professional American football punter for the San Antonio Brahmas of the XFL. He was signed by the Philadelphia Eagles as an undrafted free agent in 2013. He played college football at LSU.

Wing achieved fame during several nationally televised games for his accuracy and leg strength in LSU's punting game. He was also the first college football player to be penalized under a new rule regarding on-field taunting during scoring plays.

Early life
Wing was born in Melbourne, Victoria, Australia. His parents are Kathi and David Wing. His father David tried out with the Detroit Lions, then punted professionally for the Scottish Claymores. Growing up, Wing played Australian rules football which he says has contributed to his ability to punt so accurately. The younger Wing was cut from his TAC Cup club, the Sandringham Dragons, ending his Australian rules career. At that time, family friends of the Wings in Baton Rouge, Louisiana offered to host him for his senior year of high school as part of a student exchange program while trying out American football punting. He attended Parkview Baptist High School, where he was named All-State. During one of his football games, his mom, Kathi, coincidentally sat next to Les Miles' wife, Kathy. Kathy Miles said Wing played well and she would let Les Miles know to "keep him on the radar." Wing then was notified that he was being recruited by LSU. He eventually received a scholarship offer from LSU. Notably, he did not recognize LSU head coach Les Miles when the latter made his first visit to recruit him; he had to be told who Miles was. His family moved to Baton Rouge during the 2011 season in order to be with him during his LSU career.

College career
As a redshirt freshman, Wing averaged 43.0 yards per punt in 42 punts with a long of 73 yards through 12 games.  That same year, he landed 20 punts inside the opponent's 20-yard line. In top-ranked LSU's 9–6 overtime win at Alabama in the 2011 season, Wing kicked a 73-yard punt, hitting a camera wire, forcing overtime. Wing gained notoriety during a game against the Florida Gators by stretching his arms out during a fake punt play on his way to a 52-yard touchdown. Due to a new rule taking effect that season, Wing was flagged for taunting, and the touchdown was nullified. Going into the BCS National Championship Game against Alabama, opponents had attempted to return Wing's punts only 17 times for a total of 6 yards. During 2011 and 2012, Wing averaged 44.6 yards per punt, which is the highest in school history for a player with at least 100 punts. Wing was suspended from the 2012 Chick-fil-A Bowl for an "undisclosed violation of team rules." However, in a podcast episode, Wing disclosed that he was asked to leave LSU for failing drug tests. The school did not state this publicly and instead cited "academic misconduct" and "violation of team rules" for Wing's leaving.

On 4 January 2013, Wing announced that he would enter the 2013 NFL Draft.

Professional career

Philadelphia Eagles
After Wing went undrafted in the 2013 NFL Draft, the Philadelphia Eagles signed him to compete with fellow former LSU punter Donnie Jones in training camp.

Pittsburgh Steelers
In 2014, Wing signed a contract with the Pittsburgh Steelers to serve as the punter and holder for field goals and PATs. In the fourth quarter of a game against the Tampa Bay Buccaneers, his punt went only 29 yards, giving the ball to the Buccaneers at the Steelers' 46-yard line with 40 seconds to go. The Buccaneers scored the game-winning touchdown a few plays later.

In a game against the Baltimore Ravens on  2 November 2014, following a botched snap on the extra point for which Wing was the holder, he completed a pass to Matt Spaeth for a two-point conversion, and thus became the first Australian player in NFL history to score from a pass.

New York Giants
On 4 September 2015, Wing was traded to the New York Giants for a seventh round draft pick. After the Giants acquired Wing from the Steelers, veteran punter Steve Weatherford was released the same day. In 2015, he punted 76 times and had a 44.5-yard gross average and a 38.9-yard net average. 33 of his punts were downed inside the 20-yard line, which tied the Giants’ single-season record set by Brad Maynard in both 1997 and 1998. On 11 July 2016, Wing signed a 3-year contract extension with the Giants. The extension was reportedly worth three years and $6.45 million.

Wing earned NFC Special Teams Player of the Week for two weeks in a row. In Week 14 against the Dallas Cowboys, Wing pinned the Cowboys inside the 20-yard line five times and in Week 15 for booting seven punts averaging 40 yards downing two inside the 20-yard line.

On 10 March 2018, Wing was released by the Giants.

Memphis Express
In 2018, Wing signed with the Memphis Express of the AAF for the 2019 season.  He was waived on 27 February 2019.

San Antonio Brahmas
Wing was selected with the 23rd pick in the Specialists Phase of the 2023 XFL Draft by the San Antonio Brahmas.

References

External links

 LSU Tigers bio
 New York Giants bio

1991 births
Living people
American football punters
Australian players of American football
LSU Tigers football players
New York Giants players
Philadelphia Eagles players
Pittsburgh Steelers players
San Antonio Brahmas players
Sandringham Dragons players
Sportspeople from Melbourne
Australian rules footballers from Victoria (Australia)
Memphis Express (American football) players